The Laotian shad (Tenualosa thibaudeaui) is a species of fish in the family Clupeidae. It is found in the Mekong River drainage in Cambodia, Laos, Thailand, and Vietnam.

References

Tenualosa
Taxonomy articles created by Polbot
Fish described in 1940